Ksar El Boukhari District is a district of Médéa Province, Algeria.

The district is further divided into 3 municipalities:
Ksar Boukhari
Mefatha
Saneg

Districts of Médéa Province